This is the list of presidents of Lombardy since 1970. Colours in the number column reflect their political parties.

Politics of Lombardy
Lombardy